Hans Seidelin (14 May 1665 - 19 January 1740) was a Danish civil servant and landowner who was raised to peerage in 1731. He was district governor of Copenhagen County from 1724 to 1730 and later served as Post Master General of Royal Danish Mail.

Early life
Seidelin was born on 14 May 1776 in Helsingør, the son of pastor Hans Hansen Seidelin and Sophie Davidsdatter.

Career
He worked as an amanuensis in Danish Chancellery from 1677 to 1679. He then became a clerk (skriver) at the General Commission (Generalkommissariatet) and 10 years later a bookkeeper (krigsbogholder( for the cavalry. In 1708-09, he was appointed as War Commissioner and secretary of the General Commission (generalkommisariatssekretær). In 1710, he was promoted to bookkeeper at the General Commission and Senior Field War Commissioner (overkrigskommissær til felts; until 1712) and kancelliråd. In 1713, he was appointed as land- og krigskommissær for Xealand. Møn, Lolland and Falster (until 1724). He served both in the Scanian War and in the Great Northern War.

After the war, in 1724, he was appointed as etatsråd and district governor (antnabd) of Copenhagen County.  He also served as Supreme Court justice from 24 to 1739 and Hofretten justice from 1731 to 1735.

He stopped as district governor of Copenhagen County in 1730 to serve as assume a position as director of Generalpostamtet and in 1740 he was appointed to Post Master General of the Royal Danish Mail.

Property
Seidelin purchased Hagestedgård at Holbæk in 1730 and Holbæk Ladegård in 1732. He was ennobled on 6 April 1731 and appointed as konferensråd in 1732.

Personal life
 
Seidelin was married twice, first to Drude Margrethe Clausdatter Ravn and then to Helene Margrete Eriksdatter Munk. His first wife bore him three children: Sophie Hansdatter Seidelin (1693-1741), Hans Hansen Seidelin (1695-1732) and Claus Seidelin (1727-1730).

Seidelin died on 17 February 1746. Hagestedgård and Holbæk Ladegård was passed on to his son Hans Hansen Seidelin (1695-1732) but were later, since he had no children, passed on to his sister's eldest son Hans Didrik Brinck-Seidelin-

References

External links
 Hans Hansen Seidelin, til Hagestedgård ved Holbæk

Danish civil servants
18th-century Danish landowners
Seidelin family
1665 births
1740 deaths
People from Helsingør